The Sames Auto Arena (formerly known as the Laredo Entertainment Center and Laredo Energy Arena) is a multi-purpose arena in Laredo, Texas. It is located next to Bob Bullock Loop (US 59/Loop 20), on the northeastern side of Laredo. Within the Sames Auto Arena complex, there are several hotels within a walking distance. The Laredo International Airport is also nearby.

History
The City of Laredo funded the $36.5 million project through a one-quarter percent sales tax increase that was approved by Laredo voters on August 12, 2000, with the facility's groundbreaking taking place in June 2001. The facility opened in October 2002. With  of continuous open floor space, the Sames Auto Arena has the largest indoor convention space in South Texas. The 178,000 square foot facility has a seating capacity that can be expanded up to 9,622 for concerts, with 14 luxury suites, six meeting rooms and a private club.

The facility's management company, SMG, oversees all aspects of the arena including operations, concessions, scheduling, ticketing, and marketing. Arena Ventures owns 35 additional acres around the site that is currently being developed with hotels and office parks, specialized retail stores and restaurants, and a $1.5 million water feature with fountains, a boardwalk and quarter-mile jogging track.

In 2010, the previously-named Laredo Entertainment Center was renamed the Laredo Energy Arena after Laredo Energy purchased the venue's naming rights. Eight years later, Sames Auto Group purchased the naming rights to the arena and the venue is now known as the Sames Auto Arena.

Naming history
Laredo Entertainment Center 
Laredo Energy Arena 
Sames Auto Arena

Gallery

References

Indoor ice hockey venues in the United States
American Basketball Association (2000–present) venues
Basketball venues in Texas
Sports venues in Laredo, Texas
American football venues in Texas
Indoor arenas in Texas
Sports venues completed in 2002
2002 establishments in Texas